Love Is Blind may refer to:

 "Love is blind", a proverbial phrase

Film
 Love Is Blind (1925 film), a German silent film directed by Lothar Mendes
 Love Is Blind, a 2002 film by Denis Piel
 Love Is Blind (2005 film), an Indian Gujarati film directed by Vipul Sharma
 Love Is Blind, a 2013 Estonian film directed by Ilmar Raag
 Love Is Blind (2016 film), a Philippine film directed by Jason Paul Laxamana
 Love Is Blind, a 2017 short film starring Arsi Nami
 Love Is Blind (2019 film), an American film directed by Andy Delaney and Monty Whitebloom

Literature
 Love Is Blind (novel), a 2018 novel by William Boyd
 Love Is Blind, a 2006 novel by Lynsay Sands

Music

Albums
 Love Is Blind (Claire Voyant album) or the title song, 2002
 Love Is Blind (Limahl album) or the title song, 1992
 Love Is Blind, by Metropolitan, featuring Bjørn Kjellemyr, 2004
 Love Is Blind, an EP by Haunts, 2009

Songs
 "Love Is Blind" (Donny Montell song), 2012
 "Love Is Blind" (Eve song), 1999
 "Love Is Blind", by Alicia Keys from The Element of Freedom, 2009
 "Love Is Blind", by Cristal Snow, competing to represent Finland in the Eurovision Song Contest 2016
 "Love Is Blind", by David Coverdale from Into the Light, 2000
 "Love Is Blind", by Dream Evil from United, 2006
 "Love Is Blind", by Fergie from Double Dutchess, 2017
 "Love Is Blind", by Gene Simmons from Gene Simmons Vault, 2017
 "Love Is Blind", by Human Nature from Walk the Tightrope, 2004
 "Love Is Blind", by Indiana Gregg from Woman at Work, 2007
 "Love Is Blind", by Janis Ian from Aftertones, 1976
 "Love Is Blind", by Kana Nishino, a B-side of the single "Aitakute Aitakute", 2010
 "Love Is Blind", by Låpsley from Long Way Home, 2016
 "Love Is Blind", by Nick Fradiani from Hurricane, 2016
 "Love Is Blind", by Pulp from Separations, 1992
 "Love Is Blind", by Ramzi and Ash King
 "Love Is Blind", by Ray Pilgrim, 1961
 "Love Is Blind", by Richie Kotzen from 24 Hours, 2011
 "Love Is Blind", by Scorpions, 1999
 "Love Is Blind", from the film Anaganaga Oka Roju, 1996
 "Love Is Blind", from the musical Falsettos, 1992

Television
 Love Is Blind (TV series), a 2020 Netflix original TV series
 Love Is Blind: Brazil
 Love Is Blind: Japan
 "Love Is Blind" (House), an episode of House
 "Love Is Blind" (The Twilight Zone), an episode of The New Twilight Zone
 "Love Is Blind", an episode of Eddie Griffin: Going For Broke
 "Love Is Blind", an episode of Sanford
 "Love Is Blind", an episode of Total Blackout
 "Love Is Blind", an episode of USA High

See also
 "Love Is Blindness", a song by U2